The Isukha, are a tribe of the Luhya nation of Kenya. Among the Luhya, the Isukha are known as Abiisukha. They reside Kakamega District neighboured by the Idakho and the Tiriki. They perform the traditional celebratory dance known as Isukuti.

See also 
 Idaxo-Isuxa-Tiriki language
 Luhya people

References 

 http://www.reliefweb.int/rw/fullMaps_Af.nsf/luFullMap/14A6905F99640EF98525766A0065CCB6/$File/map.pdf?OpenElement 

Luhya